Étude Op. 25, No. 9 in G-flat major, known as the Butterfly étude, is an étude by Frédéric Chopin. The title Butterfly was not given by Chopin (as is true for all Chopin pieces with such titles); however Arthur Friedheim said, "while some titles were superfluous, this one is inadequate."

Analysis

The composition is a study of staccato – marcato alternations, marked throughout the piece. The piece is marked Allegro assai and is written in  meter. It is the shortest of Chopin's études; it lasts under a minute played at the indicated tempo. The melody is created by playing a detached octave, then two non-detached octaves. This makes a four-note group, the structure of which is used during the whole piece to convey the melody. This structure of rapid octaves can pose a challenge to the less technically experienced. Another difficulty is in the constant switching of solid octaves to detached octaves. It is much more straightforward to simply play one or the other for the whole piece.

References

External links 
 
 Op. 25, No. 9 played by Josef Hofmann
 Op. 25, No. 9 played by Alfred Cortot
 Op. 25, No. 9 played by Claudio Arrau
 Op. 25, No. 9 played by Adam Harasiewicz
 Op. 25, No. 9 played by Vladimir Ashkenazy
 Op. 25, No. 9 played by Maurizio Pollini
 , Valentina Lisitsa

25 09
1834 compositions
Compositions in G-flat major